The Australian Centre for Photography (ACP) is a not-for-profit photography gallery in Darlinghurst, Sydney, Australia that was established in 1973. ACP also provides part-time courses and community programs. It is one of the longest running contemporary art spaces in Australia.

The Australian Centre for Photography has published Photofile, a biannual photography journal, since 1983.

The ACP is a charity. Due to funding pressures during 2020, it ceased its activities from 16 December 2020 pending a restructure.

Function
The Australian Centre for Photography provided a photography gallery and also part-time courses and community programs. Amongst its initiatives were its hosting the Australian Video Festival; presenting public talks by such speakers as Victor Burgin; running an auction in support of Aboriginal protest against the Australian Bicentenary; and administrating displays in Sydney streets and railway stations of posters by Barbara Kruger.

Photofile 
Tamara Winikoff, director of ACP (1982-1985) began publication of Photofile, a small community newspaper in 1983 which became a significant journal showcasing Australian photography in a glossy, large format (44cm) and hosting the critiques and debates surrounding it. It was issued 3 times yearly from 1991. 

Editors included Mark Hinderaker, Mark Johnson, Ingeborg Tyssen & Tamara Winnikoff (with Robert Tuckwell for one issue) (1983); Mark Johnson (1984-85); Geoffrey Batchen (1985-86); Catherine Chinnery (1987); Catherine Chinnery & Carole Hampshire (1987/88); Ross Gibson (Guest Editor, 1988); Helen Grace (Guest Editor, 1988); Adrian Martin (Guest Editor, 1988); Robert Nery (1988-89); Elizabeth Gertsakis (Guest Editor, 1989); Fiona Macdonald (1990); Martin Thomas (1991-93); Jo Holder (1993-94); George Alexander (1995-97); Jacqueline Millner & Annemarie Jonson (Guest Editors, 1996); Bruce James (1997-99); Blair French (Managing Editor 1998-9);Francisco Fisher (Guest Editor 2000).

Without capital to increase circulation to attract more advertising for its funding, its survival in the 1990s was threatened. Alasdair Foster as director (1998-2011) secured increased financial support, enabling its print run to be increased and for the first time the magazine was distributed nation-wide through newsagents. 

From 2010 Photofile was issued as a digital-only publication until Kon Gouriotis began as Director in early 2012 and a print version was relaunched in March 2013. The journal was again relaunched in 2017 under the new editorship of Daniel Boetker-Smith.

An anthology of essays from Photofile was published in 1999 as Photo files : an Australian photography reader edited by Blair French, with a preface by Gael Newton, then Senior Curator of Photography at the Australian National Gallery.

History
On 23 April 1970, leading Australian photographer, David Moore wrote a letter to Wesley Stacey, Grant Mudford and David Beal. In it he asked them to discuss with him the idea of a non-profit, national centre for photography to research, exhibit, publish, collect and advance photography. To examine the situation of photography in Australia he led a committee of other practising photographers Wesley Stacey, Laurence Le Guay, senior curator of the Art Gallery of NSW and Sydney Morning Herald art critic, Daniel Thomas. and the director of an architectural and planning firm, Peter Keys, with support from arts commentator Craig McGregor. In July 1973, the Visual Arts Board accepted that there was a need for such a body in Australia and part-funded their proposal to set up a permanent photographic gallery in Sydney.

Venues 
Margaret Whitlam opened the first ACP gallery in a corner terrace refurbished by architect Michael Standley at 76a Paddington Street, Sydney, on 21 November 1974 with the initial exhibition Aspects of Australian Photography. The organisation subsequently changed the location of its gallery and offices several times. Christine Godden as director oversaw the moving of the Centre in 1981 to Dobell House at 257 Oxford Street, Paddington but in 1989, subsequent director Denise Robertson, previously of Melbourne University Union's George Paton Gallery, finding the Centre suffering from a deficit and a declining public profile, foreshadowed another relocation due to Paddington becoming "too expensive". It shared space with the Sydney Dance Company theatre at Pier 4/5 refurbished at a cost of $16 million to create a venue "second only to the Sydney Opera House", as announced by the Ministry for the Arts in May 1991. 

Under the directorship of Deborah Ely the Oxford Street premises were upgraded after mediation by NSW Ministry for the Arts persuaded the building's vendor the Dobell Foundation to waive $750,000 of the mortgage, and through an arrangement negotiated protractedly over 1993-4 variously with entrepreneur Rene Rivkin with caterer Maggi Agostini, then Victoria Alexander and others, to lease a café/restaurant in the shopfront, with the ACP offices and gallery behind. A temporary closure in September 1993 saw refurbishments begin, with further assistance from the Ministry of $50,000 and also its loan of $300,000. In the interim the gallery opened at 27-31 Abercrombie St., Chippendale (6km closer to the CBD and now housing Galerie pompom) under the name Temporary Hoarding to continue with a few shows into November 1994, including Reflex (12-27 August), sustained by curator/publicist Susan Charlton organising brochures and "Sydney Artbus" public tours.  It was not until March 1996 that NSW Premier Bob Carr reopened the Centre, and its café (ultimately named La Mensa). 

From 2011, as photography students increasing turned to courses in tertiary institutions for instruction, revenue from the ACP's film-based workshops continued to fall, and in 2015, the Centre was forced to sell its building. It rented accommodation at 72 Oxford Street, Darlinghurst, Sydney. Its current location is at 21 Foley St, Darlinghurst, a kilometre west along Oxford Street from number 72, and closer to the CBD.

Directors 

 Graham Howe 1974–5
 Bronwyn Thomas 1975–1977
 Laurence Le Guay (Acting) October 1977–February 1978
 Christine Godden 1978-1982
 Tamara Winikoff 1982–1985
 Lawrence Bendle (Acting) 1985
 Denise Robinson 1986–1992
 Deborah Ely 1992–1997
 Alasdair Foster 1998–2011
 Kon Gouriotis 2012–2015
 Catherine Baldwin (Acting) 2015-2017
 Cherie McNair 2017-2019
 Pierre Arpin 2019-

2020 temporary closure 
On 19 November 2020 the Australian Centre for Photography, announced it would go into a 'hibernation' from 16 December "due to a cash crunch brought on by COVID-19 lockdown, the shift to smartphone photography and funding cuts.". A restructure of the organisation would protect it from "ongoing financial losses"; ACP Chairman, Michael Blomfield said: "our organisation will not receive any operational funding from federal or state funding bodies for the next three years as a minimum, it is clear that continuing to operate in our current form is a pathway to extinction."

Co-incident with the closure of the ACP, planning was taking place for a National Centre for Photography, with galleries, library, darkroom, an archive and education
program, to be opened in regional Ballarat, funded with $6.7 million from the Victorian state government. The city is home to the Ballarat International Foto Biennale which has been running since 2005.

Initiatives 
The ACP produced the first major retrospectives of Max Dupain, Olive Cotton and Mervyn Bishop. An early opportunity for photographers initiated by the ACP  in 1978 was the Colonial Sugar Refinery Project, a commission for six Australian practitioners, Micky Allan, Sandra Edwards, Mark Johnson, Graham McCarter, Lewis Morley and Jon Rhodes, to freely make artistic and documentary work relating to the CSR site at Pyrmont. After its successful exhibition and publication the project was extended into the 1980s and inspired other art-based, non-commercial collaborations with industry. Signature Works - 25th Anniversary Exhibition, in 1999 included works by Fiona Hall, Bill Henson, Carol Jerrems, Maria Kozic, Tracey Moffatt, Max Pam, Patricia Piccinini, Jon Rhodes, Michael Riley, and Anne Zahalka selected by 25 Australian photographic curators, writers, artists and academics, and was a contemporary survey indicative of the national reach of the Centre.

Exhibitions

See also
Australian Centre for the Moving Image
Brummels Gallery
The Photographers' Gallery and Workshop
Centre for Contemporary Photography
Galley Museum
Queensland Centre for Photography

References

External links

Resources for Australian Centre for Photography at National Library of Australia

1973 establishments in Australia
Art galleries established in 1973
Art museums and galleries in New South Wales
Photography museums and galleries in Australia
Photography magazines